was a  after Kanji and before Eichō. This period spanned the years from December 1094 through December 1096.

Change of Era
 January 19, 1094 : The new era name was created to mark an event or series of events. The previous era ended and the new one commenced in Kanji 8, on the 15th day of the 12th month of 1094.

Events of the Kahō Era
 1095 (Kahō 2, 4th month): Emperor Horikawa paid visits to the Iwashimizu Shrine and to the  Kamo Shrines.
 1095 (Kahō 2, 8th month): The emperor was stricken with intermittent fevers; and he ordered prayers to be offered   for his return to good health. After Horikawa recovered his health, he  was generous and appreciative to the Buddhist priests who had prayed for his recovery.
 1095 (Kahō 2, 11th month): The Buddhist priests of Mt. Hiei came down from their mountain to protest a dispute with Minamoto Yoshitsuna and other government officials  which had led to military action and bloodshed. The priests carried a portable shrine as far as the central hall of Enryaku-ji, where a curse was laid on daijō-daijin Fujiwara Moromichi.
 November 26, 1096 (Kahō 3, 9th day of the 11th month): Former-Emperor Shirakawa entered the Buddhist priesthood at the age of 44.

Notes

References
 Brown, Delmer M. and Ichirō Ishida, eds. (1979).  Gukanshō: The Future and the Past. Berkeley: University of California Press. ;  OCLC 251325323
 Kitagawa, Hiroshi and Bruce T. Tsuchida, ed. (1975). The Tale of the Heike. Tokyo: University of Tokyo Press.  OCLC 164803926
 Nussbaum, Louis-Frédéric and Käthe Roth. (2005).  Japan encyclopedia. Cambridge: Harvard University Press. ;  OCLC 58053128
 Titsingh, Isaac. (1834). Nihon Ōdai Ichiran; ou,  Annales des empereurs du Japon.  Paris: Royal Asiatic Society, Oriental Translation Fund of Great Britain and Ireland. OCLC 5850691
 Varley, H. Paul. (1980). A Chronicle of Gods and Sovereigns: Jinnō Shōtōki of Kitabatake Chikafusa. New York: Columbia University Press. ;  OCLC 6042764

External links
 National Diet Library, "The Japanese Calendar" -- historical overview plus illustrative images from library's collection

Japanese eras